The Photonically Optimized Embedded Microprocessors (POEM) is DARPA program. It should demonstrate photonic technologies that can be integrated within embedded microprocessors and enable energy-efficient high-capacity communications between the microprocessor and DRAM. For realizing POEM technology CMOS and DRAM-compatible photonic links should operate at high bit-rates with very low power dissipation.

Current research 
Currently research in this field is at University of Colorado, Berkley University, and Nanophotonic Systems Laboratory ( Ultra-Efficient CMOS-Compatible Grating Coupler Design).

References

External links 
 University of Colorado, Photonically Optimized Embedded Microprocessors
 MIT Photonic Microsystems Group, Nanophotonic Systems Laboratory
 Berkley ,  Electrical Engineering and Computer Sciences 
 DARPA , News and events Electricity, Light, Join Forces to Advance Computing
 Chen Sun RISC-­‐V Microprocessor Chip with Photonic I/O

Computer hardware